Om Prakash Singh (born 6 February 1946) is a senior politician associated with the Bharatiya Janata Party, Uttar Pradesh since its inception. He has served as Irrigation minister in two occasions: 1991-92 & 1997-2002. He has also served as the President of the Uttar Pradesh unit of the Bharatiya Janata Party in 2000 and served as the floor leader of the BJP in Uttar Pradesh Legislative Assembly from 2007-12.

References 

1943 births
State cabinet ministers of Uttar Pradesh
People from Mirzapur district
Uttar Pradesh MLAs 1977–1980
Bharatiya Janata Party politicians from Uttar Pradesh
Uttar Pradesh MLAs 2007–2012
Members of the Uttar Pradesh Legislative Council
2021 deaths
Deaths from the COVID-19 pandemic in India